Oasis is a collaborative album by Colombian singer J Balvin and Puerto Rican rapper Bad Bunny, released on June 28, 2019. The pair previously collaborated on Cardi B's 2018 single "I Like It". "Qué Pretendes" was released as the lead single with a video alongside the album, being later followed by "La Canción", "Yo Le Llego", and "Cuidao por Ahí".

The album debuted at number 9 on the US Billboard 200 and number 1 on the Top Latin Albums and Latin Rhythm Albums chart with first week sales of 36,000.

Background 
Oasis was first teased during a J Balvin interview with Beats 1 radio host Ebro Darden and was first announced during an interview with Complex in September 2018. The album is meant to be deemed as a new and "refreshing" sound. In a press release, Bad Bunny called it "a transcendental and refreshing album; it is a rescue, a relief", while J Balvin said they both "always seem to be on the same wavelength, as he likes what I like."

Accolades

Track listing 
Credits adapted from Universal Music Publishing Group's catalog.

Charts

Weekly charts

Year-end charts

Certifications

References 

2019 albums
J Balvin albums
Bad Bunny albums
Collaborative albums
Spanish-language albums
Universal Music Latino albums
Albums produced by Sky Rompiendo
Albums produced by Tainy
Albums produced by Legendury Beatz